The 1960 Houston Oilers season was the first season for the Houston Oilers as a professional American football franchise; Head Coach Lou Rymkus led the Oilers to the AFL Eastern Division title, with a 10–4 record. It was also the first American Football League season. It ended with a 24–16 victory in the AFL championship game at home over the Los Angeles Chargers (10–4).

Offseason

AFL draft 
In the 1960 AFL draft, the Houston Oilers selected the following players.

 Peter Arena, G, Northwestern
 Dick Bass, HB, College of Pacific
 William Bohler, E/T, St. Ambrose
 Larry Cadwell, T, Louisville
 Billy Cannon, HB, Louisiana State
 Doug Cline, LB, Clemson
 DeJustice Coleman, HB, Illinois
 Bob Crandall, HB, New Mexico
 Cleatus Drinnon, C, Hardin–Simmons
 John Gremer, G, Illinois
 George Herring, G/T, North Texas State
 Steve Johnson, QB, Pepperdine
 John Lands, E, Montana
 Jacky Lee, QB, Cincinnati
 Bruce Maher, HB, Detroit

 Don Mattson, T, Southern California
 Mike McGee G, Duke
 Hugh McInnis, E, Mississippi State
 Max Messner, T, Cincinnati
 George Mulholland, E, New Mexico State
 Gary O'Steen, HB, Alabama
 Gene Prebola, E, Boston University
 Palmer Pyle T, Michigan State
 William Roach, T, Texas Christian
 Robert Simms, E, Rutgers
 Phillip Snowden, QB, Missouri
 Don Underwood, G/T, McNeese State
 Duane Whetstone, FB, George Washington
 Bob White FB, Ohio State
 Maury Youmans, T, Syracuse

Regular season 
 The Oilers scored an important victory over the NFL when they signed the Heisman Trophy winner, All-America running back Billy Cannon of LSU. Cannon joined other Oiler offensive stars such as veteran quarterback George Blanda.

Standings

Schedule

Week 1: at Oakland Raiders

Week 2: vs. Los Angeles Chargers

Week 3: vs. Oakland Raiders

Notable stats

Roster

Postseason

AFL Championship Game 

Houston Oilers 24, Los Angeles Chargers 16
January 1, 1961, at Jeppesen Stadium, Houston, TexasAttendance: 32,183

Scoring
 LA – Field goal Ben Agajanian 38 LA 3–0
 LA – Field goal Agajanian 22 LA 6–0
 HOU – Smith 17 pass from George Blanda (Blanda kick) HOU 7–6
 HOU – Field goal Blanda 18 HOU 10–6
 LA – Field goal Agajanian 27 HOU 10–9
 HOU – Bill Groman 7 pass from Blanda (Blanda kick) HOU 17–9
 LA – Paul Lowe 2 run (Agajanian kick) HOU 17–16
 HOU – Billy Cannon 88 pass from Blanda (Blanda kick) HOU 24–16

Awards

Sporting News American Football League All-League Team – 1960 
The American Football League did not have an All-Star game after its first season in 1960, but an All-League team, selected by vote of the AFL players themselves, was published by the Sporting News. In later years, the All-League players were augmented by

References 

 Oilers on Pro Football Reference
 Oilers on jt-sw.com

Houston Oilers
American Football League championship seasons
Houston Oilers seasons
Houston